Hitman: Absolution is a 2012 stealth video game developed by IO Interactive and published by Square Enix's European branch. It is the fifth installment in the Hitman series and the sequel to 2006's Hitman: Blood Money. Before release, the developers stated that Absolution would be easier to play and more accessible, while still retaining hardcore aspects of the franchise. The game was released on 20 November 2012 for Microsoft Windows, PlayStation 3, and Xbox 360. On 15 May 2014, Hitman: Absolution – Elite Edition was released for OS X by Feral Interactive; it contains all previously released downloadable content, including Hitman: Sniper Challenge, a "making of" documentary, and a 72-page artbook. On 11 January 2019, Warner Bros. Interactive Entertainment released enhanced versions of Absolution and Blood Money for the PlayStation 4 and Xbox One as part of the Hitman HD Enhanced Collection.

Absolutions single-player campaign follows genetically-engineered contract killer Agent 47 and his efforts to protect a similarly genetically enhanced teenage girl from various parties who wish to use her potential as an assassin for their own ends, including a private military company, several criminal syndicates, and 47's own former employers, the International Contract Agency (ICA). For the first time in the series, the game also features an online compenent called "Contracts", which allows players to create their own custom objectives for any of the missions in the base game and share them with others.

The game was met with a polarized reception upon release, with most of the praise focusing on its graphics, environments and locations, as well as the varied gameplay options. However, many critics and players disliked the game for its linear structure as opposed to the open ended nature of previous installments. As of March 2013, the game had sold over 3.6 million copies. Following Absolution's disappointing reception, the series received a soft reboot in 2016's Hitman, which despite being set in the same continuity as previous installments, returned to the more open-ended style of gameplay and featured a new storyline.

Gameplay

Hitman: Absolution is a stealth game in which the player assumes the role of a hitman named Agent 47. Presented from a third-person perspective, the gameplay centers around completing set objectives within a series of levels. Objectives can range from simply reaching the end of the level, to eliminating specific individuals. The players choose how to complete each level, taking branching paths to get to a target or location. Players may use pistols, bottles or bricks, assault rifles, shotguns, fiber-wire, or steel pipe against enemies if opting for the action-oriented approach, or avoid enemies altogether, not being seen, using disguises, blending into the environment, and only attacking the set target(s), if using the stealth-oriented approach. Agent 47 also has the 'Instinct' ability that lets the player monitor enemies more easily. There are also environmental ways to kill or distract individuals; players can use poison to spike coffee, pull switches to make a disco ball fall and break, cause a massive explosion at a gas station, pull a switch to cause scaffolding to fall down, cause fires, or set off fireworks. Players complete chapters in order to progress through the story. The player journeys to various locations, including a mansion, library, strip club, gun store, wrestling arena, courthouse, and hotel during the story.

The game introduces an online option to the series, 'Contracts', where players can create their own missions for other players to complete. Players choose one of the areas from the game's story missions and decide which non-player characters (NPCs) are required to be eliminated, what weapon must be used to eliminate each target, what disguise is required, whether the body must be hidden or not and if the player is allowed to be spotted by the AI. "Contracts" was shut down in May 2018 due to IO Interactive not owning or controlling the online servers but needing to comply with GDPR legislation.

Plot
Genetically-engineered assassin Agent 47 (David Bateson) receives a contract from his employers, the International Contract Agency (ICA), to kill his former handler Diana Burnwood (Marsha Thomason), who betrayed the ICA for unknown reasons and sabotaged their funding and database, forcing them to reform. 47 confronts Diana at her Chicago estate and seemingly shoots her. Before dying, Diana confesses that she betrayed the ICA to protect a genetically-engineered teenage girl named Victoria (Isabelle Fuhrman) from a life of violence as an assassin, and asks 47 to look after Victoria in her place. 47 agrees, causing his new handler, Benjamin Travis (Powers Boothe), to brand him a traitor to the ICA.

After dropping Victoria off at the Redwood Orphanage, 47 meets disgraced ICA informant Birdie (Steven Bauer), who asks him to assassinate a local crime boss (James Sie) in exchange for information. After the hit, Birdie tells 47 about Blake Dexter (Keith Carradine), head of a home defense system company, who has taken an interest in Victoria. 47 sneaks into Dexter's room at the Terminus Hotel and learns that he is planning to kidnap Victoria and sell her to the highest bidder. 47 attempts to kill Dexter, but is knocked out, framed for the murder of a maid, and left to die in Dexter's suite after the latter sets it on fire. Escaping from the hotel, 47 kills Dexter's informant Dom Osmond (Jon Curry) at his strip club, but learns that Dexter has hired a group of mercenaries led by Edward Wade (Larry Cedar) to capture Victoria. Despite 47's efforts to stop them, they capture Birdie, who betrays Victoria's location to save himself. 47 defends Victoria at the orphanage and manages to kill Wade, but Dexter's son Lenny (Shane Stevens) grabs Victoria and escapes.

In the town of Hope, South Dakota, firmly ruled by Dexter's private military company, 47 eliminates Lenny's gang, the Hope Cougars, who were planning to kidnap Victoria from Dexter and sell her to a rival weapons company, and interrogates Lenny for Victoria's whereabots. After killing Lenny or abandoning him in the desert, 47 infiltrates Dexter Industries' laboratory to kill the scientists who examined Victoria and destroy their research data on her, and later kills Dexter's deformed bodyguard Sanchez (Isaac C. Singleton Jr.) in an underground cage fight. While recuperating at a hotel, 47 is attacked by "The Saints", Travis's personal hit squad, but manages to eliminate them.

47 eventually finds Victoria in the Hope Courthouse jail, but is captured and tortured by Dexter, until the latter is called off to a meeting with Travis, who wants to buy Victoria for $10 million. 47 escapes into the streets and pursues Hope's corrupt sheriff Clive Skurky (Jon Gries), who is on Dexter's payroll, while avoiding ICA agents searching for him. 47 corners and interrogates Skurky, who reveals Dexter is meeting with Travis in Chicago, before killing him. At the Blackwater Park in Chicago, 47 kills Dexter's secretary Layla Stockton (Traci Lords), before pursuing Dexter himself to the top of the park. Dexter tries to escape with Victoria via helicopter, but 47 mortally wounds him and rescues Victoria. After lamenting the loss of his son and money, Dexter is left to die alone.

Several months later, Travis and his men visit Diana's grave, suspecting she has faked her death, but 47 ambushes them, as he was tasked to do so in a letter left by Diana, which also mentioned that Victoria was created by Travis's funding without his ICA superiors' knowledge. After 47 mortally wounds him, Travis rants at him for wasting Victoria's potential for the ICA, and asks whether Diana is really dead, to which 47 responds "You will never know" before finishing him off. Sometime later, 47 observes Diana and Victoria from afar, confirming that Diana faked her death with 47's help and is now looking after Victoria. The game ends with a message from Diana to Agent 47 welcoming him back to the ICA and thanking him, as his actions have helped purge the ICA of internal corruption. In the final scene, Detective Cosmo Faulkner (Jonathan Adams), who has been tracking 47 since the Terminus Hotel fire, is having trouble discovering 47's identity until Birdie appears and offers to help him for a price.

Development
Though plans to continue the Hitman franchise were first announced in 2007, it was not until May 2009 that Eidos confirmed the game was in development. Certain plot details for the game were rumored in 2009, stating that the game's story would lead Agent 47 to a low point from which he would have to rebuild himself. On 20 April 2011, Square Enix filed the trademark for the name Hitman: Absolution in Europe, leading sites to speculate that it would be the name of the fifth Hitman game. On 6 May 2011, a teaser trailer was released, confirming the title Hitman: Absolution.  The trailer briefly showed Agent 47 attaching a suppressor and a rattlesnake coiled around his signature Silverballer pistol. It has been reported the game will be a "familiar and yet significantly different experience from other Hitman games." On 9 October 2011, a full gameplay trailer entitled "Run for Your Life" was released.

Originally William Mapother had been cast as Agent 47, replacing original voice actor David Bateson. Bateson had not been notified of his replacement and only found out when the first trailer was released. However, following fan backlash, Bateson was rehired just six months before the game's release. Mapother's motion capture performance for Agent 47 is still included in the game.

In 2023, chief creative officer of IO, Christian Elverdam said that Absolution "is fundamentally a really good stealth-action game" and that many of the lessons learned in creating it can be seen in World of Assassination trilogy.

Marketing
The Professional Edition of Hitman: Absolution features Professional Clamshell packaging for the game, a Hitman art book, making of DVD and the "Agency Gun Pack" DLC.

Hitman: Sniper Challenge

Hitman: Sniper Challenge, a single sniping mission, was developed by IO Interactive, originally as a pre-order bonus, available to people who pre-order the game. The code would be supplied by retailers upon pre-order of the game, and could be collected from retailers before release as a download code before the game's release. At the time of pre-order, Sniper Challenge was redeemable via the PSN Store, Xbox Live Marketplace and PC. While the console version launched worldwide on 15 May 2012, the PC version wasn't released until 1 August 2012.

Pre-order bonuses
Square Enix announced special Hitman: Absolution pre-order bonuses for selected retailers. For Steam purchased games, these downloadable content are available as well. These items only work for Contract mode and not the single-player story mode.
 High Tech Suit and Bartoli Custom Pistol – The advanced High Tech suit provides Agent 47 with 50% increased armor paired with the Bartoli Custom, an engineered precision weapon, complete with sight and silencer.
 Public Enemy Suit and the Bronson M1928 submachine gun – The Original Assassin can dress in a stylish Public Enemy gangster suit armed with the Bronson M1928, an imaginary submachine gun with high fire rate and deadly stopping power.
 Agency Kazo TRG sniper rifle – This weapon is fully upgradeable with both scope and silencer.
 High Roller Suit and the Krugermeier 2-2 Pistol – The High Roller suit dresses Agent 47 in a fancy tuxedo discreetly outfitted with the Krugermeier, an accurate, reliable stealth weapon with a built-in silencer.
 Hitman: Absolution: Public Enemy Disguise –  This disguise gives Agent 47 a 1930s gangster look.
 Hitman: Absolution: Deus Ex (Adam Jensen) Disguise – This "suit" makes Agent 47 look like Adam Jensen from Deus Ex: Human Revolution, complete with built-in sunglasses. This DLC also unlocks the Steiner-Bisley Zenith pistol from the same game.

Reception

Critical response

Hitman: Absolution received "generally positive" reviews, according to review aggregator Metacritic. Positive reviews came from GamesRadar+, calling it "one of the strongest entries in the series to date", and Game Informer, who wrote that "devising a strategy, using the environment and disguises to your advantage, and leaving before anyone knows you're there are the hallmarks of a perfect hit, and Absolution proves Agent 47 is still gaming's premier hitman."

Edge gave it 7/10, saying "the game has taken a unique formula and diluted it". VentureBeat gave it 7.5/10 saying "Absolution aims high but misses the mark." Eurogamer gave it 7/10 saying "Agent 47 doesn't begin Hitman: Absolution with amnesia, but the six years that have passed since we last took control of him in Blood Money do seem to have dulled his creators' recollections of what made him so popular in the first place." GameSpot gave it 7.5/10 saying "Hitman: Absolutions vivid world and enjoyable stealth-action gameplay overshadow its few notable inconsistencies." IGN gave it 9/10 saying "It's nice to have a game that doesn't just encourage improvisation; it requires it." Kotaku gave Absolution a positive review. Giant Bomb gave it 4/5, as did Joystiq. Destructoid gave it 8.5/10. 1Up.com gave the game an A- saying "Hitman Absolution didn't win me over with its story, but its gameplay maintains a standard of excellence and introduces a level of choice that deserves your attention."

The Daily Telegraph gave the game a 2/5 saying "Despite the fact that Absolution is a hugely disappointing entry into the canon, Hitman is still a fabulous series." International Business Times gave the game a 5/10 saying "An unremarkable, derivative clone of a game that's barely a shadow of what Hitman used to be." VideoGamer.com gave it 5/10 saying "The problem with Absolution is that its new custodians from the Kane and Lynch team seem to have fundamentally misunderstood what made Hitman great." PC Gamer gave it 66% saying "A passable stealth game, but one that betrays almost everything that, until now, has made Hitman great." GameTrailers gave it 6.9/10 saying "It's clear that a good deal of effort was put into crafting Hitman: Absolutions world. This makes its flaws all the more unfortunate." The New Statesman gave no rating but said "If developers want to win back fans when they revisit established franchises maybe they should look to what made those games popular in the first place and by doing so maybe they'd avoid stepping on a rake or two." The Irish Times gave no score but said "The move away from the completely open world may leave some hardcore fans of Hitman disappointed." The Daily Record gave the game 3/5 saying "While it's more accessible than previous Hitman games, Absolution loses a lot of the freedom that fans of the franchise love, and perhaps doesn't necessarily fit the Hitman name any longer." The Escapist gave no score but said "Hitman: Absolution is not the best nor the worst Hitman". The Guardian gave it 3/5 saying "The game may look better and play better than any Hitman game before it, but one can only marvel at how IO managed to lose sight of their IP's most appealing aspects so often."

Sales 
On 26 March 2013, Square Enix announced that the game had sold about 3.6 million copies at retail, but has failed to reach predicted sales targets.

Technical issues
Shortly after launch, scores of complaints came in about the game crashing, freezing and corrupting file saves on the PlayStation 3 and the Xbox 360, rendering many of the games unplayable. On 26 November 2012, IO Interactive stated that they were working around the clock to try and fix these technical errors, but also stated that they did not know what exactly was causing the errors, so a patch may take some time.

The patch for the PS3 version was released on 11 December 2012, while the Xbox 360 patch was released on 20 December 2012.

Controversies
On 29 May 2012, a cinematic teaser trailer, produced by Square Enix's CGI studio Visual Works, titled "Attack of the Saints", was released. The trailer's depiction of "gun-toting, PVC and latex-clad nuns being killed in a hail of bullets" sparked controversy over the allegedly sexist portrayal of women. IO Interactive's Tore Blystad, the game's director, later apologized, stating they're "sorry that we offended people" and that it "was truly not the intention of the trailer."

On 4 December 2012, IO Interactive faced heavy criticism for releasing a Hitman: Absolution Facebook app that allowed users to identify and threaten Facebook friends for assassination. Methods of identifying female friends included "her hairy legs", "her muffin top" and "her small tits". Methods of identifying male friends included "his ginger hair", "his shit hair" and "his tiny penis". Users could choose a reason to kill their friend, such as the fact that they "smell bad" or were cheating on their partner. Friends received a personalised video on their Facebook wall identifying them as a target. Signing up to watch the video presented recipients with a mixture of their own photos and Facebook details merged into a video of Hitman character Agent 47 shooting them. IO Interactive admitted the promotional app was in bad taste and removed it the same day.

Accolades 
Hitman: Absolution was nominated for 'Best Action Game' at the 9th British Academy Games Awards. It was nominated for 'Action Game of the Year', 'Outstanding Achievement in Animation' and 'Outstanding Achievement in Visual Engineering' at the 2013 D.I.C.E. Awards.

Notes

References

External links

2012 video games
Feral Interactive games
Absolution
Multiplayer and single-player video games
MacOS games
PlayStation 3 games
Square Enix games
Stealth video games
Video games set in Chicago
Video games set in Cornwall
Video games set in South Dakota
Video games developed in Denmark
Video games developed in the Netherlands
Windows games
Xbox 360 games
Video games developed in the United Kingdom
Nixxes Software games